"The Telephone Call" (German: "Der Telefon-Anruf") is a song by the German electronic music band Kraftwerk. It was released in 1987 as the second and final single from their ninth studio album, Electric Café (1986). The single was their second number-one on Billboard Hot Dance Club Play and stayed two weeks at the number-one spot. It is the only Kraftwerk song to feature Karl Bartos on vocals. The versions from the single were remixed by François Kevorkian.

Versions
In the 2009 remastered edition of Electric Café, which was issued under the album's original intended title Techno Pop, the original album version of 'The Telephone Call' is absent, replaced by the shorter and subtly-different 7-inch single mix. As a replacement for the latter part of the original album track (which contained telephone sounds and operator voices), the remix "House Phone" was inserted. However, when the remastered album was originally issued in 2004 as part of the promotional version of The Catalogue, the original album version was featured and "House Phone" was not, as the album featured its original 6 tracks with no bonuses. The promo copies of the box set containing the earlier remaster of Techno Pop were subsequently withdrawn and became collector's items.

Music video
The song's black-and-white music video features each member of the band answering a telephone (Ralf Hütter's being a novelty grandpiano-shaped phone which he happens to play before picking the receiver up). None of the band members are seen singing the song in the video except for a silhouette Karl Bartos, but when the camera pans around it is revealed to in fact be Wolfgang Flür. He is also seen at a typewriter typing "You're so close, but far away". At several other points in the video, various other iconic images are seen including a dangling phone on a wire and an eye staring through a hole in a wall, the latter appearing for only one second in the video. The images give the video an unsettling feeling.

Track listing
English versions only

7-inch single

12-inch single

Charts

Weekly charts

Year-end charts

References

1987 singles
Kraftwerk songs
1986 songs
Songs about telephone calls
Songs written by Ralf Hütter
Songs written by Florian Schneider
Songs written by Karl Bartos
EMI Records singles
Warner Records singles